Quintus Mucius Scaevola (early 2nd century BC) was a politician of the Roman Republic, believed to be the son of his namesake who was praetor in 215 BC. He was made praetor in 179 BC, and became governor of Sicily. In 174 BC, he was made consul, and in 171 BC, tribune. In this latter position, he accompanied his brother-in-law Publius Licinius Crassus on campaign against Perseus of Macedonia.

His son was Quintus Mucius Scaevola Augur (c. 159 – 88 BC), much younger than his cousins.

2nd-century BC Roman consuls
Roman governors of Sicily
Scaevola, Quintus